The Island Games (currently known as the NatWest International Island Games for sponsorship reasons) are biennial international multi-sports events organised by the International Island Games Association (IIGA). Competitor teams each represent different island communities (with one team from the peninsula of Gibraltar) which are IIGA members. Currently all competitor teams represent non-sovereign territories of European nations—some within European waters and some further overseas.

The most recent edition was the 2019, which took place in Gibraltar with around 2,000 competitors from 22 islands or island groups participating in 14 sports. The next games will be hosted by Guernsey in 2023, postponed from 2021.

History 
The Island Games began in 1985 as the Inter-Island Games, as part of the Isle of Man International Year of Sport, and were intended to be a one-off sporting celebration only. Geoffrey Corlett, who became the first Games Director, not only contacted the islands surrounding the United Kingdom, but also encouraged the countries of Iceland and Malta, the territories of Faroe Islands, Greenland, Saint Helena, the Channel Islands and others to participate.

Initially, fifteen islands with 600 competitors and officials took part in seven sports, with the total cost of staging the Games being put at £70,000. The track and field events were held on an eight-lane grass track, a far cry from the current games, which now use synthetic tracks in stadiums capable of holding thousands of spectators. The Games of 1985 were so successful that organisers decided to hold a similar event two years later. The Games have grown from strength to strength, with limits now in place for the number of teams, currently 23, and the number of sports at each Games, currently 12 to 14. Sark could be considered the most successful island, their population of 600 having acquired 20 medals by 2015, one for every 30 people.

NatWest International has been the main sponsor of the Games since 1999. In April 2018, they signed a deal extending their sponsorship until at least 2021.

Game venues 

Guernsey put in a bid for the 2021 Games following the Faroe Islands' withdrawal from hosting. The bid was approved in July 2016. Due to the COVID-19 pandemic, the 2021 Games were cancelled and rescheduled for 2023 with Guernsey still as hosts, with future hosts pushed out by two years as well.

Orkney will host the 2025 Games. They were awarded the right to host on 7 July 2018 at the AGM in Gibraltar.

In May 2018, the Parliament of the Faroe Islands guaranteed €1,500,000 towards hosting the Games in or before 2029.

In August 2018 it was reported that the Falkland Islands are considering hosting the Games in 2033, and "the Island Games Executive is planning to visit the Falklands in 2020 for their Spring Meeting" to discuss the proposition.

Participation

A total of 27 islands, island groups or territories have participated in the Island Games; eleven of these have participated in every Island Games.

Islands marked in grey are no longer members of the IIGA and so cannot compete at the Island Games.

Of the 23 current IIGA members, two (Bermuda and the Cayman Islands) have competed in their own right at the Olympic Games. Bermuda, the Cayman Islands, the Falkland Islands, Gibraltar, Guernsey, the Isle of Man, Jersey and St. Helena have each sent teams to the Commonwealth Games.

Medals (1985-2019)

Sports 
The host country chooses between 12 and 14 different sports for their games from this list:

Notably, the Island Games' football tournament is one of the most well-established tournaments of non-FIFA international football.

Olympic athletes
Islanders who have gone on to participate in Olympic Games events include:
 Mark Cavendish (Isle of Man) — cycling (Olympic silver medal winner)
 Cameron Chalmers (Guernsey) - 4 x 400m - Tokyo 2020
 Dale Garland (Guernsey) - 4 × 400m - Beijing 2008
 Rebecca Heyliger (Bermuda) - swimming
 Pál Joensen (Faroe Islands) — swimming (World Championship bronze medal winner)
 Lee Merrien (Guernsey) - Marathon - London 2012
 Cydonie Mothersille (Cayman Islands) — 200m (World Championship bronze medal winner)
 Kelly Sotherton (Isle of Wight) — heptathlon and 400m (Olympic bronze medal winner)
 Mattias Sunneborn (Gotland) — long jump and 200m (World Indoor Championship silver medal winner)
 Albert Torres (Menorca) — cycling (World Championship gold medal winner)
 Andres Lauk (Saaremaa) − cycling − Atlanta 1996

Notes

References

External links 

 International Island Games Association
 Previous Results in Island Games

 
Recurring sporting events established in 1985
Multi-sport events
NatWest Group